Thunder Ridge USD 110 is a public unified school district headquartered in Kensington, Kansas, United States.  The district includes the communities of Kensington, Athol, Agra, Kirwin, and nearby rural areas.

Schools
The school district operates the following schools:
 Thunder Ridge High School in Kensington.
 Thunder Ridge Middle School in Agra.
 Thunder Ridge Elementary School in Kensington.

History
In 2008 West Smith County USD 238 and Eastern Heights USD 324 combined to form Thunder Ridge USD 110.

See also
 Kansas State Department of Education
 Kansas State High School Activities Association
 List of high schools in Kansas
 List of unified school districts in Kansas

References

External links
 

School districts in Kansas
School districts established in 2008
2008 establishments in Kansas
Education in Smith County, Kansas